Choe Inseok (born 1953) is a [South Korean] writer, playwright and screenwriter who is a significant figure in Korean Realism.  He began writing fiction because he felt limited by censorship. Choe Inseok says the following. “At the time, there was censorship. If you finished writing a script, you had to submit it to the Performing Arts Committee before putting on the show. Then the committee would read the script. They’d cross out certain sections with red lines, demanding an edit, and in the worst case the show couldn’t happen. You could only put up a show once you passed through censorship. Fiction or poetry would get censored afterwards, but performances would get censored beforehand. Due to such conditions of the time, it was difficult to write a script and put up a play. So I began writing fiction.”

He has written multiple novels. Gangcheolmujigae (강철무지개 Iron Rainbow), a novel published in 2015, is a science fiction story about Korea after 2100. In Gangcheolmujigae (강철무지개 Iron Rainbow), the value of labor in Korea has fallen, and nuclear waste has been spilled over the Yellow Sea, turning it into a sea of death. Society is controlled by a totalitarian regime, and other than the fact that there has been reunification, it is a place of darkness. Upon such imagination of science fiction, Choe Inseok throw a question of realism regarding reality.

Life 
Choe Inseok was born on September 17, 1953, in Namwon Jeollabuk-do, as a second son among 2 sons and 4 daughters. His father was a reporter at a regional newspaper, and was also an editorialist. Later, he spent his life as a student in Jeonju and Seoul. His literary dreams began during his high school years. He went to university in 1972.

His first writings were play scripts. In 1977, he submitted a play to a new writer's contest, and that led to him participating in a ‘Playwriting Workshop’ taught by Yeo Seok-ki, a professor of English literature at Korea University at the time. He wrote a play “Byeokgwa chang” (벽과 창 The Wall and the Window) in this workshop, and that play won the Monthly Korean Literature New Writer's Award in 1980, launching his literary career. Afterwards, he put up various plays on the stage, actively pursuing his career as a playwright. With “Eotteon saramdo sarajiji anneunda” (어떤 사람도 사라지지 않는다 No One Disappears), he won the Baeksang Arts Awards New Writer's Award in 1983, and the Yeonghui Play Award in 1985. In the same year he won the Korean Literature Prize New Writer's Award with “Geu Chanlanhadeon yeoreumeul wihayeo” (그 찬란하던 여름을 위하여 For That Shining Summer). In 1988 he won the Grand Bell Award in Dramatization for “Chilsu and Mansu” (칠수와 만수), showing his talent in various areas.

His start as a fiction writer began in 1986, when his novel Gugyeongkkun (구경꾼 The Onlooker) won the Novelists’ Award. He was writing fiction novels and play writing, also occasionally translating, he eventually came to focus on writing fiction, which became his main profession. Particularly, in Nae yeonghonui oomul (내 영혼의 우물 The Well of My Soul), the fantasy world that was in the novel was praised by the literary community as searching for a new method of depicting a changed reality, also influence many writers later. With his collection Nae yeonghonui oomul (내 영혼의 우물 The Well of My Soul) he won the 3rd Daesan Literary Award in 1995. He won the 8th Park Young-joon Literary Prize in 1997 with his novella Norae-e gwanhayeo (노래에 관하여 About Singing), and he won the 8th Hahn Moo-Sook Literary Prize in 2003 with his collection Gureongideului jib (구렁이들의 집 The House of Serpents).

Writing 

Literary critic Hwang Jong-yeon has pointed to the characters that Choe Inseok has carefully reproduced through his fiction, and state that they “are a type of people who promoted political radicalism”, and that they “possess social identity that coincides with those who are considered as people that had predominated literature in the 70s and the 80s”. Hwang Jong-yeon has further said the following on the characters and the places that are featured in Choe Inseok's fiction. “The people Choe Inseok depicts in his fiction are those that have broke off or have been cast out from the established order. They are those for whom it is impossible to lead a life like a normal person, such as a criminal serving a sentence in a prison, a laborer working on construction sites, and the poor in a red-light district that have become morally corrupted. Moreover, his fiction often limits itself to a certain place, where the surrounding characters can fully use their advantages. Isolated places like prisons, detention camps, brothels, construction sites, orphanages, the military, and remote villages form quite dramatic environments where common sense and ideas on life are overlooked, and certain terrible truths regarding humanity are revealed.”

Works

Short Story Collections 
 Moksumui gieok (목숨의 기억 The Memory of Life), Munhakdongne, 2006.
 Gureongideului jib (구렁이들의 집 The House of Serpents), Changbi, 2001.
 Areumdaun na-ui Gwisin (아름다운 나의 鬼神 My Beautiful Ghost), Munhakdongne, 1999.
 Nareul saranghan pyein (나를 사랑한 폐인 The Cripple Who Loved Me), Munhakdongne, 1998.
 Hondoneul hyanghayeo hangeoleum (혼돈을 향하여 한걸음 A Step Towards Chaos), Changbi, 1997.
 Nae yeonghonui oomul (내 영혼의 우물 The Well of My Soul), Goryeowon (Goryeowon Media), 1995.
 Inhyeongmandeulgi (인형만들기 Making Dolls), Hangilsa, 1991.
 Saette (새떼 A Flock of Birds), Hyeonamsa, 1988.

Novels 
 Gangcheolmujigae (강철무지개 Iron Rainbow), 2014.
 Tugikkundeuleul wihan membeosip teureining (투기꾼들을 위한 멤버십 트레이닝 Membership Training for Speculators), Silcheon Munhak, 2013.
 Yeonae, haneun nal (연애, 하는 날 A Day of, Love), MunyeJoongang, 2011.
 Geudaereul ileun nalbuteo (그대를 잃은 날부터 From the Day I Lost You), Jaeum & Moeum (Ireum), 2010.
 Yaktali sijakdwaetda (약탈이 시작됐다 The Looting Has Begun), Changbi, 2010.
 Isanghan nara-eseo on spai (이상한 나라에서 온 스파이 The Spy From a Strange Country), Changbi, 2003.
 Seokeoseu seokeoseu (서커스 서커스 Circus Circus), Chaeksesang, 2002.
 Aneseo bakkateseo (안에서 바깥에서 From the Inside From the Outside), Purunnamu, 1992.
 Nae maeumeneun akeoga sanda (내 마음에는 악어가 산다 A Crocodile Lives In My Mind), Sallim Books, 1990.
 Gugyeongkkun (구경꾼 The Onlooker), Soseolmunhaksa, 1986.

Works in Translation 
 Der Brunnen meiner Seele (German)
 Le puits de mon âme (French)

Awards 
 2003 8th Hahn Moo-Sook Literary Prize
 1997 8th Park Young-joon Literary Prize
 1995 3rd Daesan Literary Award
 1988 the 27th Grand Bell Award in Dramatization
 1985 Yeonghui Play Award
 1985 Korean Literature Prize New Writers Award
 1983 the 19th Baeksang Arts Awards New Writers Award
 1980 Korean Literature New Writers Award

Further reading 
 Kim, Dong-sik, “The Faces of Those Past Disillusionment and In Front of the Abyss”, Literature and Society, Fall 1995.
 Kang, Jin-ho, “The World of Tragedy, and the Method of Despair and Rejection: Study on Choi Ihn Suk”, Literature and Practice, Fall 1999.
 Son, Jeong-su, “The Social History of Thoughts Achieved by a Body of Experiences: Study on Choi Ihn Suk”, Writer's World, Spring 2000.
 Seo, Yeong-in, “How Enlightenment and Reality, Despair and Fantasy are Related: Study on Choi Ihn Suk”, Creation and Criticism, Winter 2000.
 Bok, Do-hun, “Literature from the Future”, Cheonnyeonui sijak, Spring 2009.
 Kim, Mi-jeong, “How Does a Novel’s Form Coincides With The World View”, Literature and Practice, Winter 2014.

External links 
 The Encyclopedia of Contemporary Korean Literature
 Interview on Publication of Gangcheolmujigae, Interpark Book DB, 2015.
 Arts Council Korea Author Profile

References 

1953 births
Living people
South Korean male writers
South Korean dramatists and playwrights
Male dramatists and playwrights
In-seok